Silvio Adzic (born 23 September 1980 in Grünstadt) is a German football player who currently play for TuS Altleiningen. He made his debut on the professional league level in the Bundesliga for 1. FC Kaiserslautern on 30 September 2000 when he came on as a substitute in the 68th minute in a game against FC Energie Cottbus. He scored one goal in his first Bundesliga season, an equalizer in the 1–1 tie against Hamburger SV.

Honours
Kaiserslautern

 DFB-Pokal finalist: 2002–03

Germany U16

 UEFA European Under-16 Championship third place: 1997

References

1980 births
Living people
People from Grünstadt
German footballers
Footballers from Rhineland-Palatinate
1. FC Kaiserslautern players
1. FC Kaiserslautern II players
VfB Lübeck players
SpVgg Unterhaching players
TuS Koblenz players
FSV Oggersheim players
Bundesliga players
2. Bundesliga players
Association football midfielders